Discovery Velocity is a Canadian Category B specialty channel owned by CTV Specialty Television, a joint venture of CTV Specialty Television Inc. and Warner Bros. Discovery. It is a Canadian version of the U.S. channel formerly of the same name (now known as Motor Trend), and broadcasts factual and reality-style series related to automobiles and transportation (including series from Discovery's library).

History
Beginning in August 2003, CTV had operated a channel known as Discovery Channel HD, which served as a high-definition simulcast of the main Discovery Channel lineup, where applicable. In August 2005, the Canadian Radio-television and Telecommunications Commission (CRTC) approved an application for a new category 2 digital service, Discovery HD Theatre (based on the U.S. channel of the same name), covering many of the same genres as Discovery Channel, but with a separate lineup consisting exclusively of high definition programming. Discovery HD Theatre replaced Discovery Channel HD on December 19, 2005. While maintaining the same format, the channel was renamed Discovery HD in 2009.

In June 2010, CTVglobemedia announced that it would launch three new Discovery-branded channels in Canada, among them included a re-branding of Discovery HD as Discovery World HD (later just Discovery World) on August 2, 2010, with a new lineup aiming to "showcase a beautiful and brilliant portrait of our world in vivid high definition". A separate HD simulcast of Discovery Channel returned in June 2011.

In January 2015, Bell Media announced that Discovery World would be re-branded as Discovery Velocity on February 12, 2015. It is a Canadian version of the U.S. channel Velocity—which was the current format of the network's original U.S. counterpart. With the re-branding, the network increased its focus on automotive-oriented series, although selected non-automotive programs from Discovery World were carried over.

See also
 Discovery Turbo
 Discovery HD (International)

References

External links
 

Bell Media networks
Warner Bros. Discovery networks
Digital cable television networks in Canada
Television channels and stations established in 2005
2005 establishments in Canada